
Aubergine is a restaurant in Steyl in the Netherlands. It is a fine dining restaurant that is awarded one Michelin star in the period 2006–2018.

GaultMillau awarded the restaurant 14 out of 20 points. 

Head chef of Aubergine is Paul Pollux.

See also
List of Michelin starred restaurants in the Netherlands

References 

Restaurants in the Netherlands
Michelin Guide starred restaurants in the Netherlands
Restaurants in Limburg (Netherlands)
Buildings and structures in Venlo